Werner Wolf Glaser (14 April 1910 – 29 March 2006, Västerås, Sweden) was a German-born Swedish composer, conductor, pianist, professor, music critic, and poet.

Life
Born in Cologne, Glaser studied piano, conducting, and composition at the Cologne Conservatory, and art history afterwards in Bonn. He finally continued his studies in composition with Paul Hindemith in Berlin, where he also took courses in psychology.  From 1929 to 1931, he worked as a conductor at the Chemnitz Opera and went to Cologne in 1932 to conduct choirs.  Persecuted by the Nazis due to his Jewish descent, he fled Germany for Paris in 1933.  He subsequently moved to Lyngby, Denmark and lectured at the Frederiksbergs Folkemusikhojskole in Copenhagen. In 1939, he opened a School of Music in Lyngbby with composer Irene Skovgaard. Glaser collaborated with Skovgaard and her brother Hjalte Skovgaard on several publications. He escaped during the rescue of the Danish Jews to Sweden in 1943.  In Sweden, he conducted the Södra Västmanlands Orkesterförbund from 1944 to 1959 and also directed the Västerås Musikskola, where his colleagues included Ivar Andrén and Gunnar Axén, until 1975. He also wrote music reviews and poems for the regional daily Vestmanlans Läns Tidning. He died in 2006 and was buried in the Jewish Cemetery in Stockholm.

Glaser left an extensive oeuvre which spanned many different genres. His tonal language revealed the influence of Hindemith, but he also developed his individual style.

Selected works

Orchestral
 Symphony No. 1, op. 10 (1933–34)
 Symphony No. 3 (1936–40)
 Trilogy for Orchestra No. 1 (1939)
 5 Pieces for Orchestra (1940–42)
 Symphony No. 4 (1943)
 2 Short Orchestral Pieces (1945)
 Prelude for Orchestra (1947)
 Symphony No. 5 (1947–49)
 Idyll, Elegy and Fanfare for Orchestra (1954)
 Symphony No. 6 Sinfonia breve della transparenza (1955–57)
 Concerto for Orchestra No. 2 (1957)
 Sorgmusik över en flicka for String Orchestra (1957)
 Symphony No. 7 Azione tardante (1959)
 Symphony No. 8 Fyra dans-scener (Four Dance Scenes) (1964)
 Violin Concerto (1964)
 Concerto for Orchestra No. 3 Conflitti (1965–66)
 Förvandlingar (Transformations) for Orchestra (1966)
 Paradosso I for String Orchestra (1967)
 3 Symphonic Dances for Orchestra (1975)
 Symphony No. 9 (1976)
 Adagio for Strings Ruhe und Unruhe (1977)
 Symphony No. 10 (1979–80)
 Trilogy for Orchestra No. 2 (1981)
 Symphony No. 11 (1983)
 Nigeria (1986), suite based on ancient Nigerian sculptures
 Theme and Variations (1987)
 Symphony No. 13 (1990)
 Baritone saxophone Concerto (1992)

Chamber music
Sonata for viola and piano (1939)
The Birds Sing: 20 Canons (1939) (for recorder; with Hjalte Skovgaard, text by Irene Skovgaard)
Gamle man (1943) for voice and piano
Dansvisa (1945) for voice and piano
Tranquillo for violin (or flute) and viola (1946)
Allegro, Cadenza e Adagio for saxophone and piano (1950)
Capriccio No.2 for viola and piano (1963)
Duo for two violins (1966), recorded by Duo Gelland for Nosag
Ordo Meatus (1967) for oboe d'amore
Serioso (1969) for oboe and harpsichord
Absurt divertimento (1974) for soprano and wind quintet
Sommar (1975) for soprano and flute
Sommar (Version 2, 1976) for voice and piano
Marsch i skrattspegel (1976) for wind quintet
Per Sylvestrum (1977) for flute and piano
Fågelliv (Vie d'oiseau) (1980), three pieces for soprano and string trio
Pensieri for viola solo (1981)
Fanfara per ASEA (1983) for 3 trumpets and timpani
Solo for Euphonium

Concert band
Concerto della Capella (1960) for symphonic winds and piano
Concerto for Concert Band (1966)
Marsch i blåsväder) (1974)
Symphony for Wind Instruments (1980)
3 Pieces for 11 Saxophones (1981) for 2 soprano, 4 alto, 2 tenor, 2 baritone, and 1 bass saxophones

Choral
Der Tod ist groß (1936) for mixed choir
Melankolians visor Suite (1963)
Dagen Suite (1964)
Årskrets (1967) for children's choir
Vårmosaik (1968) for mixed choir and string quartet

Stage
Persefone (1960), ballet in 3 acts
En naken kung (1971), opera in 2 acts
Möten (1970), chamber opera for vocal soloists, flute, clarinet, and string orchestra
Les cinq pas de l'homme (1973), ballet

Cantatas, and religious music
Tystnad (1966), cantata for soprano, flute, alto saxophone, bass clarinet, drums, gong, violin, cello, and  reel-to-reel
Porten (1968), Advent cantata for soprano and organ
En aftonkantat (1973), cantata for vocal soloists, two mixed choirs, flute, clarinet, horn, and organ
Meditationspsalm (1972) for mixed voices and organ

References

Richter, Otfried.  "Glaser, Werner Wolf", in Lexikon verfolgter Musiker und Musikerinnen der NS-Zeit, 2006. (in German)

1910 births
2006 deaths
20th-century classical composers
German classical composers
Jewish emigrants from Nazi Germany to Sweden
Jewish classical composers
Swedish music educators
Swedish art historians
Swedish classical composers
German male classical composers
Swedish conductors (music)
Male conductors (music)
Swedish music critics
Swedish male poets
20th-century Swedish poets
20th-century German composers
Hochschule für Musik und Tanz Köln alumni
20th-century Swedish male writers
20th-century conductors (music)
20th-century German male musicians